Paracleodoxus is a genus of beetles in the family Cerambycidae, containing the following species:

 Paracleodoxus cineraceus Monne & Monne, 2010
 Paracleodoxus simillimus Monne & Monne, 2010

References

Acanthocinini